The 2022/23 FIS Nordic Combined World Cup, organized by the International Ski Federation is the 40th Nordic Combined World Cup season for men, and the 3rd season for women. The men's competition started in Ruka, Finland and will concluded in Lahti, Finland. The women's competition will start in Lillehammer, Norway and will concluded in Oslo, Norway.  

Norwegians Jarl Magnus Riiber and Gyda Westvold Hansen are the defending overall champions from the 2021–22 season.

Map of world cup hosts 
All 11 locations hosting world cup events for men (11), for women (6) and shared (6) in this season.

Men 
 World Cup history in real time

after GUL event in Oslo (12 March 2023)

Calendar

Men's team 

 World Cup history in real time

after Sprint in Lahti (26 February 2022)

Standings

Overall

Nations Cup

German Trophy

Best Jumper Trophy

Best Skier Trophy

Prize money

Women 

 World Cup history in real time

after GUN event in Oslo (11 March 2023)

Calendar

Standings

Overall

Nations Cup

Best Jumper Trophy

Best Skier Trophy

Prize money

Mixed team 
World Cup history in real time

after Relay event in Otepää (6 January 2023)

Provisional Competition Rounds (PCR)

Men

Women

Podium table by nation 
Table showing the World Cup podium places (gold–1st place, silver–2nd place, bronze–3rd place) by the countries represented by the athletes.

Points distribution 
The table shows the number of points won in the 2022/23 FIS Nordic Combined World Cup for men and women.

Achievements 
First World Cup career victory 

Men
 Julian Schmid (23), in his 5th season – the WC 1 in Ruka

Women

First World Cup podium 

Men
 Matteo Baud (20), in his 3rd season – the WC 3 in Ruka – 2nd place
 Thomas Rettenegger (22) in his 3rd season – the WC 8 in Otepää – 3rd place
 Laurent Muhlethaler (25) in his 7th season – the WC 18 in Schonach – 3rd place

Women
 Nathalie Armbruster (16), in her 2nd season – the WC 1 in Lillehammer – 3rd place
 Jenny Nowak (20), in her 3rd season – the WC 8 in Schonach – 2nd place

Number of wins this season (in brackets are all-time wins) 

Men
 Johannes Lamparter – 7 (10)
 Jarl Magnus Riiber – 6 (55) 
 Jens Lurås Oftebro – 3 (4)
 Julian Schmid – 3 (3)
 Vinzenz Geiger – 1 (10) 

Women
 Gyda Westvold Hansen – 10 (17)

Retirements 
Following are notable Nordic combined skiers who announced their retirement:

Men
 Eric Frenzel

Women

Notes

References 

FIS Nordic Combined World Cup
World cup
World cup
Nordic combined